Utiel is a municipality in the comarca of Plana de Utiel in the Valencian Community, Spain.

According to the 2014 census, the municipality has a population of 12,082 inhabitants.

The Shrine of El Remedio is located on top of the Sierra de Utiel range, near Utiel.

Population centres
Utiel town.
Las Casas, at the feet of the Sierra de la Bicuerca, with 350 inhabitants.
Los Corraleses, about 5 km from Utiel town, with 327 inhabitants
Las Cuevas, with 607 inhabitants. The railway station of the Cuenca-Valencia line is located in this village.
Estenas, in the Sierra del Negrete, with 34 inhabitants
La Torre, about 13 km NW of Utiel town, with 145 inhabitants 
Other minor settlements include El Remedio, Casas de Medina and El Hontanar.

Economy

Bodegas Vicente Gandia, Valencian wine producer and seller company founded in 1885

References

External links

Municipalities in the Province of Valencia